The Þór Akureyri women's basketball team, commonly known as Þór Akureyri, is the women's basketball department of Þór Akureyri multi sports club, based in the town of Akureyri in Iceland. It has won the national championship three times and currently plays in 1. deild kvenna.

Honors
 Úrvalsdeild (3):
1969, 1971, 1976

 Icelandic Basketball Cup (1):
1975

 Division I (1):
2017

Individual awards

1. deild kvenna Domestic All-First team
Erna Rún Magnúsdóttir - 2010
Fanney Lind Thomas - 2016
Heiða Hlín Björnsdóttir - 2018
Sylvía Rún Hálfdánardóttir - 2019
Rut Herner Konráðsdóttir - 2017, 2019
Unnur Lára Ásgeirsdóttir - 2017, 2018

Notable players
 Fanney Lind Thomas
 Friðný Jóhannesdóttir
 Guðný Jónsdóttir
 María Guðnadóttir
 Sylvía Rún Hálfdánardóttir
 Þóra Þóroddsdóttir

Coaches
 Einar Bollason 1968–1969
 Guttormur Ólafsson
 Anton Sölvason
 Benedikt Guðmundsson 2015–2017
 Helgi Rúnar Bragason 2017–2019
Daníel Andri Halldórsson 2021–present

Notes

References
Official Website  
Eurobasket team profile
KKÍ: Þór Akureyri – kki.is  

Basketball teams in Iceland
Basketball teams established in 1966